Bluewave Chonburi Futsal Club (Thai สโมสรฟุตซอลชลบุรี บลูเวฟ) is a Thai Futsal club. They currently play in the Futsal Thailand League.

History

Beginnings
Chonburi Bluewave Futsal Club founded in 2006 and affiliated to the first season of the Thailand Futsal League. Chonburi Bluewave Futsal Club won the championship two times in the 2006 and 2009 season before the end of the provisional squad.

The Thai giant
The team has come back again under the control by the Chonburi Sports Association and Chonburi Football Club as Government Housing Bank RBAC Chonburi Futsal Club or (GHB-RBAC Chonburi Futsal club) .  Finally turning back to the old name Chonburi Bluewave. Chonburi have won the 2010, 2011–12, and the 2012-13 Futsal Thailand League.

The Greatest in Asia
In August 2013,  After finishing champions in the 2012 Futsal Thailand League season, Chonburi Bluewave under Pulpis head coach secured direct qualification into the 2013 AFC Futsal Club Championship. In the group stages, for first games The Sharks draw Ardus Tashkent from Uzbekistan, 2–2 beat Giti Pasand, 4-3 and beat Al Sadd, 3–2. For their final leg of the AFC Futsal Club Championship Semi-finals against Chinese side Shenzhen Nanling. Having won, 5–2. In Final The Sharks draw Giti Pasand, 1-1 by 1 goal of Suphawut Thueanklang and the club won 1-4 by penalties after extra time. Suphawut Thueanklang received the most valuable player award.

In July 2017, After finishing champions in the 2016 Futsal Thailand League season, Chonburi Bluewave under Rakphol SaiNetngam head coach secured direct qualification into the 2017 AFC Futsal Club Championship. In the group stages, for first games The Sharks beat Bank of Beirut, 9–0 and beat AGMK from Uzbekistan, 5–0. For their final leg of the AFC Futsal Club Championship Quarter-finals against Japanese side Shriker Osaka. Having won, 4–2. In Semi-finals The Sharks beat Thái Sơn Nam, 6–0. The Sharks beat Giti Pasand, 3–2 in final by hattrick of Suphawut Thueanklang. Jirawat Sornwichian received a Top Scorer award with nine goals.

Youth Academy
PTT Chonburi academy in Bangkok. The club have been sending coaches over to schools to teach kids how to play futsal.

Trophies

League

Thailand Futsal League
  Winners (11) : 2006, 2009, 2010, 2011–12, 2012–13, 2014, 2015, 2016, 2017, 2020, 2021-22

Cup

Thai Futsal FA Cup
  Winners (5) : 2010, 2011–12, 2014, 2015, 2019

International

Intercontinental Futsal Cup
 Fourth place (1) : 2018
AFC Futsal Club Championship
  Winners (2) : 2013, 2017
  Runner-up  (1) : 2014
  Third place (1) : 2016
AFC futsal team of the year (1): 2013
AFF Futsal Club Championship 
  Winners (2) : 2019, 2021

Current players

 
(vice-captain)

Notable former players 
 2006-2013  Anucha Munjarern
 2006-2011  Panuwat Janta
 2007-2015  Lertchai Issarasuwipakorn
 2007-  Kritsada Wongkaeo
 2007-  Suphawut Thueanklang
 2015-  Xapa

Asian Competitions Appearances
 AFC Futsal Club Championship: 8 appearances
2011: Group stage
2012: Group stage
2013: Champions
2014: Runner-up 
2015: Group stage
2016: Third place
2017: Champions
2018: Quarter-final

Sponsorship

Government Housing Bank (G.H. Bank) and Rattana Bundit University are the team's main sponsors.

Club officials

Crests

References

See also
 Chonburi FC

Chonburi F.C.
Futsal clubs in Thailand
Futsal clubs established in 2006
2006 establishments in Thailand